Endoxyla acontucha is a species of moth of the family Cossidae. It is found in Australia (including Queensland) and New Zealand.

References

Moths described in 1903
Endoxyla (moth)